Choccolocco Park is a baseball stadium located in a municipal park of the same name in Oxford, Alabama. The NCAA's Ohio Valley Conference utilized the stadium for its postseason conference baseball tournament after the 2017 and 2018 seasons.

References

Baseball venues in Alabama